Hendrika "Riek" Alida van Rumt (28 August 1897 in Amsterdam – 26 May 1985 in Amsterdam) was a Dutch gymnast. She won the gold medal as member of the Dutch gymnastics team at the 1928 Summer Olympics in her native city.

References
 profile

1897 births
1985 deaths
Dutch female artistic gymnasts
Olympic gymnasts of the Netherlands
Gymnasts at the 1928 Summer Olympics
Olympic gold medalists for the Netherlands
Gymnasts from Amsterdam
Olympic medalists in gymnastics
Medalists at the 1928 Summer Olympics